Ryan Lindsay (born April 13, 1976) is a Canadian former professional and collegiate ice hockey player.

Prior to turning professional, Lindsay played the 1998-99 season with the Canada men's national ice hockey team.

Awards and honours

References

External links

1976 births
Living people
Kalamazoo Wings (1974–2000) players
Oshawa Generals players
Quad City Mallards (UHL) players
Sportspeople from Norfolk County, Ontario
Canadian ice hockey centres